UCAT may refer to:

Ulster County Area Transit, a transit operator in New York
Utah College of Applied Technology, a college in Utah
University of Chester Academies Trust, England
University Clinical Aptitude Test, an admissions test used in the United Kingdom, Australia and New Zealand